Jean-François Simard (born December 10, 1966) is a teacher and Quebec provincial politician and Cabinet Minister. He was the a member of the National Assembly of Quebec (MNA) for the riding of Montmorency from 1998 to 2003. Representing the Parti Québécois, he was a delegate minister for over a year in the Cabinet of Ministers of former Quebec Premier Bernard Landry.

Simard obtained several degrees including a doctorate in sociology from the Université Laval, a master's degree in regional development from the Université du Québec à Rimouski, a bachelor's degree in communications and sociophysiology from the Université du Québec à Montréal and a diploma in European federalism in Italy.

During the late 1980s, he was the vice-president of the Canadian liberal youth-wing but resigned following the failure of the Meech Lake Accord in 1990. He then joined the Bloc Québécois and later the Parti Québécois where he was a political adviser for former Quebec Premier Jacques Parizeau during the 1995 Quebec referendum campaign. In 1998, he was elected as MNA for Montmorency where he was named until 2001 the Parliamentary Assistant to the State Minister of Education and Youth, François Legault. In 2002 until the end of the PQ mandate, he was named the Delegate Minister for Environment and Water. When the PQ lost the 2003 elections to the Quebec Liberal Party and Jean Charest, Simard was defeated by Liberal Candidate Raymond Bernier.

After the 2003 elections, Simard was a lecturer at Université Laval at the faculty of industrial relations. Since 2004, he is a teacher at the faculty of social sciences and social work of the Université du Québec en Outaouais where he is also an administration staff member since 2006.

Electoral record

References

External links
 

1966 births
Living people
Parti Québécois MNAs
Université Laval alumni
Université du Québec à Montréal alumni
Université du Québec à Rimouski alumni
21st-century Canadian politicians
Coalition Avenir Québec MNAs